North Shore  or Northshore may refer to:

Geographic features

Australia 
North Shore (Sydney), a suburban region of Sydney
Electoral district of North Shore
North Shore railway line, Sydney
Noosa North Shore, Queensland
North Shore, New South Wales, a suburb of Port Macquarie
North Shore, Victoria, a suburb of Geelong
North Shore railway station

Canada 
Côte-Nord, the region of Quebec and associated administrative region to the north of the lower Saint Lawrence River and the Gulf of Saint Lawrence
North Shore (Greater Vancouver), several communities adjacent to Vancouver, British Columbia
North Shore Mountains, a subrange of the Pacific Ranges of the Coast Mountains including the mountains of the suburban North Shore of Greater Vancouver
North Shore (Lake Superior), the area of Ontario north of Lake Superior
North Shore (Montreal), suburban communities mainly North of the Rivière des Mille Îles, but also some across the lower end of Rivière des Prairies
North Shore (New Brunswick), an area along the Bay of Chaleur including the Acadian Peninsula and the Miramichi Bay region
North Shore, Nova Scotia (disambiguation)
The North Shore, Ontario, township along the north shore of the North Channel (Lake Huron)
North Shore, Prince Edward Island, a community in Prince Edward Island

New Zealand 
 North Shore, New Zealand, a suburban area of Auckland
 North Shore (New Zealand electorate)

United Kingdom 
North Shore, Blackpool

United States 
North Shore, California
North Shore (Chicago), Illinois
North Shore (Jacksonville), Florida
North Shore (Oahu), Hawaii
North Shore, Louisiana
North Shore (Massachusetts)
North Shore (Duluth), Minnesota
North Shore (Lake Superior), an area of Minnesota
North Shore (Long Island), New York
North Shore, Staten Island, New York
North Shore (Pittsburgh), Pennsylvania
North Shore, Wisconsin

Arts and entertainment
 North Shore, a novel by Wallace Irwin, on which the dramatic film The Woman in Red (1935) was based
 North Shore (1949 film), a documentary short film
 North Shore (1987 film), a drama film set on the North Shore of Oahu
 North Shore (TV series) (2004–05), a prime-time soap opera set in Hawaii
 "Northshore", a song off the Tegan and Sara album Sainthood

Education
 North Shore Community College, a community college in Danvers, Massachusetts
 North Shore Country Day School, a private high school located in Illinois
 Northshore High School, a high school located in Slidell, Louisiana
 Northshore School District, a school district in northern King County and southern Snohomish County, Washington
 North Shore Academy (disambiguation)

Medical
 North Shore-LIJ Health System, a health-care organization based in New York
 North Shore University Hospital, a hospital located in Manhasset, New York
 NorthShore University HealthSystem, a health-care organizations based in Illinois
 Royal North Shore Hospital, a hospital in St. Leonards, NSW Australia

Railways
 North Shore Line (disambiguation)
 North Shore Railroad (disambiguation)

Sports
 North Shore Cheetahs, an amateur Bantam AAA Div. 2 football team in Montreal, Quebec
 North Shore Lions, an amateur Bantam AAA Div. 1 football team in Montreal, Quebec

Other
 The Northshore, the largest apartment building in Austin, Texas
 North Shore Animal League America, a no-kill animal rescue and adoption organization, headquartered in Port Washington, New York

See also
 North Shore Road (disambiguation)